"Absolutely Not" is a song by the Canadian singer Deborah Cox. It was written by Cox, Eric Johnson, D. Christopher Jennings, Ahmad Russel, Tiffany Palmer, Eric Jones, and James Glasco and produced by Johnson and Jennings for the soundtrack to the comedy film Dr. Dolittle 2 (2001). Released as a single in mid-2001, "Absolutely Not" was most successful on the Billboard Dance Club Songs, where remixes by DJ Hex Hector spent two weeks at number-one in September of that year. In 2002, the song was nominated for a Juno Award in the category Best Dance Recording. Hex Hector's "Chanel Mix" of "Absolutely Not" was later included on Cox's 2002 studio album The Morning After. Covered by Dutch singer Glennis Grace, it also appeared on second season soundtrack to the North American version of Queer as Folk.

In 2020, the song was used as a Lipsync for Your Life number in the third episode of Canada's Drag Race, in which Cox was a guest host.

Charts

See also
Number-one dance hits of 2001 (USA)

References

External links
Single release info at discogs.com

2001 songs
2001 singles
Deborah Cox songs
J Records singles
Songs written by Deborah Cox